The 1953–54 Cypriot First Division was the 17th season of the Cypriot top-level football league.

Overview
It was contested by nine teams with Pezoporikos Larnaca winning the championship.

League standings

Results

References
Cyprus - List of final tables (RSSSF)

Cypriot First Division seasons
Cypriot First Division, 1953-54
1